Judd Alan Gregg (born February 14, 1947) is an American politician and lawyer who served as the 76th governor of New Hampshire from 1989 to 1993 and was a United States senator from New Hampshire; in the Senate, Gregg served as chairman of the Senate Health Committee and the Senate Budget Committee. He is a member of the Republican Party and was a businessman and attorney in Nashua before entering politics. He currently serves as the Chair of the Public Advisory Board at the New Hampshire Institute of Politics at Saint Anselm College. Gregg was nominated for Secretary of Commerce in the Cabinet by President Barack Obama, but withdrew his name on February 12, 2009. He chose not to run for reelection to the Senate in 2010, and former State Attorney General Kelly Ayotte, also a Republican, was elected to succeed him. On May 27, 2011, Goldman Sachs announced that Gregg had been named an international advisor to the firm. In May 2013, Gregg was named the CEO of the Securities Industry and Financial Markets Association, a Wall Street lobbying group. He later stepped down as CEO in December 2013 and became a senior adviser.

For the United States presidential election in 2016 Gregg endorsed former Florida Governor Jeb Bush, and upon Bush's suspension of his campaign Gregg endorsed Ohio Governor John Kasich.

Early life

Born in Nashua, New Hampshire, he is the son of Catherine Gregg (née Warner) and Hugh Gregg, who was Governor from 1953 to 1955. Gregg graduated from Phillips Exeter Academy in 1965. Gregg received his baccalaureate from Columbia University in 1969 and, from Boston University School of Law, a Juris Doctor in 1972 and a Master of Laws in 1975.

Early political career

The first elective office held by Gregg was a seat on the Executive Council of New Hampshire, a post which he held from 1979 to 1981. He was elected to the United States House of Representatives in 1980, and was reelected in 1982, 1984 and 1986.

He declined to run for re-election in 1988, and ran for Governor of New Hampshire instead. He won that election and was re-elected in 1990, New Hampshire being one of two states (Vermont is the other) that continues to elect its governors to two-year, rather than four-year, terms. As Governor, he balanced the budget, leaving the office in 1993 with a $21 million surplus. However, his political opponents in the 1990s attacked Judd for the state's weak economy and his Vietnam War deferments.

U.S. Senate tenure

Elections
In 1992, Gregg decided to run for the U.S. Senate seat being vacated by two-term Republican Warren Rudman. He defeated Democrat John Rauh, and took his seat as a United States Senator in 1993. He was re-elected to a second term in 1998 after defeating George Condodemetraky. He ran for a third term in 2004 and defeated campaign finance activist Doris "Granny D" Haddock, the then 94-year-old Democratic nominee, by 66% to 34%.

After withdrawing from his nomination to become United States Secretary of Commerce in the presidential administration of Democrat Barack Obama on February 12, 2009, Gregg said he would "probably not" seek reelection in 2010, when his term of office was set to expire.

Leadership
In January 2005, Gregg was elected to chair the U.S. Senate Committee on Budget by the Senate Republican Conference, and steadfastly supported lower spending. 

On November 14, 2008 Gregg was appointed by United States Senate Minority Leader Mitch McConnell to serve on the five-member Congressional Oversight Panel created to oversee the implementation of the Emergency Economic Stabilization Act. Gregg "stepped aside" on December 1, citing his Senate workload:

Platform
Judd Gregg is a moderate Republican. He is fiscally conservative and socially moderate. The non-partisan National Journal gave then-Senator Gregg a composite ideology rating of 65% conservative and 35% liberal.

Republicans for Environmental Protection issued Gregg an "environmental harm demerit" for sponsoring the 2006 S.C. Resolution 83, which according to REP "included only one revenue-raising instruction to Senate appropriations committees, an abuse of the congressional budget process in order to force oil drilling in the Arctic National Wildlife Refuge", and "would perpetuate America's dangerous oil dependence and damage the most scenic, wildlife-rich reserve in the circumpolar north." In 2006, Gregg received a score of 43% from the nonpartisan League of Conservation Voters.

The University of New Hampshire renamed its Environmental Technology Building Gregg Hall, because Gregg used earmarks to secure $266 million of federal funds for research and development projects for the university. The Judd Gregg Meteorology Institute (JGMI), established in 2003, is the center of meteorological and atmospheric research at Plymouth State University in Plymouth, NH, which offers the only meteorology degree program in the state. The Senator was also instrumental in the establishing of the New Hampshire Institute of Politics at Saint Anselm College in 1999.

In 2007, Gregg voted for the Clean Energy Act of 2007 (H.R. 6) and the Comprehensive Immigration Reform Act of 2007 (S. 1639).

In October 2009, Gregg said, "You talk about systemic risk. The systemic risk today is the Congress of the United States ... we're creating these massive debts which we're passing on to our children ... (the figures) mean we're basically on the path to a banana republic-type of financial situation in this country. "

Gregg has a moderate record on social issues. In June 2006, he joined six of his fellow Republicans in voting against the Federal Marriage Amendment. In April 2007, he was among the breakaway Republicans to support the Stem Cell Research Enhancement Act. However, his record on the issue of abortion is otherwise a solidly anti-abortion one. Gregg has voted for some gun control measures and against others. He voted against the Brady Bill, but in recent years has voted for trigger control locks on firearms and in favor of the ban on assault weapons.

On December 17, 2009, Gregg voted to extend Chairman Ben Bernanke's term.

Presidential politics
During the 2004 Presidential Election, Gregg stood in for John Kerry during practice sessions held by George W. Bush in preparation for the 2004 United States Presidential Election Debates. Four years earlier he had played the part of Al Gore for the same purpose.

On October 29, 2007, Gregg endorsed Mitt Romney, former Governor of Massachusetts, to be the Republican nominee for President of the United States.

Gregg has not foreclosed the possibility of running for President himself after he leaves the Senate but he has said it's "not likely":

The Spanish Justice System and Guantanamo Bay

In April 2009, Senator Gregg was sent to accompany an American diplomat to speak with a Spanish diplomat Luis Felipe Fernández de la Peña after a war crimes case was filed by Spanish NGO Association for the Dignity of Spanish Prisoners at the Audiencia Nacional of Spain accusing them of crimes in Iraq and Guantanamo Bay. The case targeted six former US government officials for allegedly violating the Geneva Convention, the 1984 Convention Against Torture, and the 1998 Rome Statute. The six accused were: Alberto Gonzales, David Addington, William Haynes, Douglas Feith, Jay Bybee, and John Yoo. A summary of the meeting as recorded in a confidential diplomatic cable released by WikiLeaks stated:

Senator Gregg expressed his concern and dismay about reported Spanish judiciary desire to indict six former Bush administration officials for allegedly creating a legal framework that permitted torture. Fernandez de la Pena lamented this development, adding that judicial independence notwithstanding, the Ministry of Foreign Affairs disagreed with efforts to apply universal jurisdiction in such cases.

Senator Mel Martinez had a similar diplomacy meeting during the same period with the same agenda discussed. Martinez noted that "the prosecutions would neither be understood nor accepted in the U.S. and would have an enormous impact on the bilateral relationship". Spanish Foreign Minister Angel Lossada retorted, "the National Court had broad jurisdiction for universal justice and that there was no political influence on the judicial process."

In an earlier cable days before the senators arrived, a US diplomat commented:

We do not know if the [Spanish] government would be willing to take the risky step of trying behind the scenes to influence the prosecutor's recommendation on this case or what their reaction to such a request would be.

Controversies
In the Senate, Gregg was the leading Republican negotiator and author of the TARP program, which bailed out financial institutions, while he had a multimillion-dollar investment in Bank of America. After leaving the Senate Gregg became an advisor to the investment bank Goldman Sachs.

In February 2009, the Associated Press reported that Gregg and his family had profited personally from federal earmarks secured by the senator for the redevelopment of the Pease Air Force Base in Portsmouth, New Hampshire into an industrial park. According to Senate records, Gregg has collected from $240,017 to $651,801 from his investments in Pease Air Force Base, while helping to arrange at least $66 million in federal aid for the former base. Gregg has denied any wrongdoing in the matter and claimed that his withdrawal from consideration for the Commerce Secretary was unrelated to the White House's discovery during the vetting process of his involvement in his family's real estate investments in Pease. Gregg explained away his actions by saying, "I've throughout my entire lifetime been involved in my family's businesses and that's just the way our family works. We support each other and our activities."

Gregg as a member of President Barack Obama's deficit commission defended cutting Social Security by quoting Willie Sutton who, when asked why he robbed banks, replied, "because that's where the money is."

Commerce Secretary nomination and withdrawal

On February 2, 2009, Politico and CNN reported that Gregg accepted President Obama's offer to be the next United States Secretary of Commerce. If Gregg had been confirmed by the Senate, he would have had to resign his Senate seat and be replaced with an appointment by Democratic Governor John Lynch. Sources from both parties confirmed that Gregg's former chief of staff, Republican Bonnie Newman, would have been chosen to replace him. The Washington Post had alleged that Gregg would not accept the appointment unless Gov. Lynch agreed to appoint a Republican to fill his seat until 2010. In February 2009, many news outlets noted that Gregg had in 1995 voted to abolish the United States Department of Commerce. Although Gregg stated that he supported the stimulus package promoted by President Obama, he clarified that he would recuse himself from voting on the package.

With reports that the Obama Administration would move the United States Census Bureau, typically run by the Commerce Department, out of Gregg's jurisdiction, Republican leaders urged Obama to allow Gregg to run the census or withdraw Gregg's nomination. On February 12, 2009, Gregg withdrew his name from consideration for the position of United States Commerce Secretary, citing disagreements with issues surrounding the census and the stimulus bill. White House Press Secretary Robert Gibbs issued a statement regarding Gregg's withdrawal in which he accused the senator of not following through on his alleged statements of support for Obama's economic agenda made during the vetting process:

While speaking to press afterward, Gregg acknowledged responsibility for his decision and accepted the blame for accepting and then rejecting the Commerce Secretary nomination.

In an interview response to the AP, Gregg was quoted as saying,

For 30 years, I've been my own person in charge of my own views, and I guess I hadn't really focused on the job of working for somebody else and carrying their views, and so this is basically where it came out.

In February 2009, the Associated Press reported that Gregg and his family had profited personally from federal earmarks secured by the Senator for the redevelopment of the Pease Air Force Base into an industrial park. According to Senate records, Gregg has collected from $240,017 to $651,801 from his investments in Pease Air Force Base, while helping to arrange at least $66 million in federal aid for the former base. Gregg claimed that his withdrawal from consideration for the Commerce Secretary was unrelated to the White House's discovery during the vetting process of his involvement in his family's real estate investments in Pease.

Personal life
Gregg belongs to the Congregationalist Church. He is married to Kathleen MacLellan Gregg. They have two daughters, Molly and Sarah, and a son, Joshua.

Gregg won more than $850,000 in 2005 from the D.C. Lottery after buying $20 worth of Powerball tickets at a Washington, D.C. convenience store.

Electoral history

See also
Unsuccessful nominations to the Cabinet of the United States

References

External links

 

Gregg as governor at New Hampshire's Division of Historic Resources
Environmental Technology building named for Senator GreggThe New Hampshire
Judd Gregg Meteorology Institute

|-

|-

|-

|-

|-

|-

|-

|-

1947 births
21st-century American politicians
Boston University School of Law alumni
Columbia University alumni
Goldman Sachs people
Republican Party governors of New Hampshire
Living people
Lottery winners
Members of the Executive Council of New Hampshire
New Hampshire lawyers
Phillips Exeter Academy alumni
Rejected or withdrawn nominees to the United States Executive Cabinet
Republican Party members of the United States House of Representatives from New Hampshire
Republican Party United States senators from New Hampshire
United Church of Christ members
People from Nashua, New Hampshire
People from Rye, New Hampshire